Ostrinia latipennis is a moth in the family Crambidae. It was described by Warren in 1892. It is found in Japan and the Russian Far East.

Hostplant: This species feed on Fallopia japonica (Houtt.) Ronse Decr.

References

Moths described in 1892
Pyraustinae